Adil Gulbahar (born 23 March 1985 in Azad Kashmir), is a Pakistani cricketer.

Domestic career

First-class career
Gulbahar made his first-class debut for Rawalpindi against Lahore Shalimar in the 2012–13 Quaid-e-Azam Trophy on 19 January 2013. He scored 9 (17) in the first innings and scored 6 (23) in the second innings. Rawalpindi won the match by 24 runs.

T20 career
Gulbahar made his T20 debut for AJK Jaguars against Islamabad Leopards in the 2014–15 National T20 Cup. He scored 16 (14). Islamabad won the match by 34 runs. Gulbahar played his next match against Faisalabad Wolves. He scored 28 (37). Faisalabad won the match by 8 wickets. Gulbahar played his last match of the tournament against Lahore Eagles. He scored 3 (9). Lahore won by 7 wickets.

References

External links
 
 Adil Gulbahar at Pakistan Cricket Board
 Adil Gulbahar at Pakistan Cricket

1985 births
Living people
Pakistani cricketers
People from Azad Kashmir